Students' Love (German:Primanerliebe) is a 1927 German silent film directed by Robert Land and starring Fritz Kortner, Agnes Straub and Wolfgang Zilzer.

The film's sets were designed by the art director Erich Zander.

Cast
 Fritz Kortner as Karsten  
 Agnes Straub as Frau Karsten  
 Wolfgang Zilzer as Rolf Karsten  
 Jaro Fürth as Frank 
 Grete Mosheim as Ellen  
 Jakob Tiedtke as Sommer  
 Emmy Flemmich as Frau Sommer  
 Teddy Bill as Teddy  
 Martin Herzberg as Max Hohlweg 
 Paul Otto as Rektor  
 Hans Rameau 
 Adolphe Engers as Teacher  
 Margarete Lanner 
 Hans Albers as Operasinger Blasiera  
 Eugen Jensen as Judge  
 Rudolf Lettinger

References

Bibliography
 Matthias Wegner. Hans Albers. Ellert & Richter, 2005.

External links

1927 films
Films of the Weimar Republic
Films directed by Robert Land
German silent feature films
German black-and-white films